Megacerops ("large-horned face", from méga- "large" + kéras "horn" + ōps "face") is an extinct genus of the prehistoric odd-toed ungulate (hoofed mammal) family Brontotheriidae, an extinct group of rhinoceros-like browsers related to horses.

Description

All of the species had a pair of blunt horns on their snout (the size varying between species), with the horns of males being much larger than those of the females. This could indicate that they were social animals which butted heads for breeding privileges.

Despite resembling the rhinoceros, it was larger than any living rhinoceros: the living animal easily approached the size of the African forest elephant, the third-largest land animal today. Its skull reached  in greatest length, with some specimens possessing substantial canines, up to 70 mm long. Megacerops resembled a large rhinoceros, possessing blunt Y-shaped horn-like protrusions on its nose up to 43 cm in length. Its mass is estimated to be in the range of  

The dorsal vertebrae above the shoulders had extra long spines to support the huge neck muscles needed to carry the heavy skull. The shape of its teeth suggests that it preferred food such as soft stems and leaves, rather than tough vegetation. It may have had fleshy lips and a long tongue for carefully selecting food.

Paleobiology

The skeleton of an adult male was found with partially healed rib fractures, which supports the theory that males used their 'horns' to fight each other. No creature living in Megacerops time and area except another Megacerops could have inflicted such an injury. The breathing movements prevented the fractures from completely healing. The adults may have also used their horns to defend themselves and their calves from predators, such as hyaenodonts, entelodonts, Bathornis or nimravids.

Discovery
Fossils were uncovered in the northern plains states. Life-sized models of Megacerops families (a male, female, and juvenile) are displayed at the James E. Martin Paleontological Research Laboratory, South Dakota School of Mines & Technology, and a different set at the Canadian Museum of Nature.

Many remains have been found in South Dakota and Nebraska. In the past, specimens exposed by severe rainstorms were found by Native Americans of the Sioux tribes. The Sioux called them "thunder beasts", a name preserved in the ancient Greek translation (bronto-, thunder; therion, beast). Many of the skeletons found by the Sioux belonged to herds which were killed by volcanic eruptions of the Rocky Mountains, which were volcanically active at the time.

Taxonomy
Megacerops was named by Leidy (1870). Its type species is Megacerops coloradensis. It was synonymized subjectively with Menodus by Clark and Beerbower (1967). It was assigned to Brontotheriidae by Leidy (1870), Carroll (1988), Mader (1989), and Mader (1998).

According to Mihlbachler and others, Megacerops includes the species of the genera Menodus, Brontotherium, Brontops, Menops, Ateleodon, and Oreinotherium.

See also

References

Brontotheres
White River Fauna
Eocene mammals of North America
Eocene odd-toed ungulates
Priabonian genus extinctions
Fossil taxa described in 1870
Taxa named by Joseph Leidy